The 1950 North Indian Ocean cyclone season was part of the annual cycle of tropical cyclone formation. The season has no official bounds but cyclones tend to form between April and December. These dates conventionally delimit the period of each year when most tropical cyclones form in the northern Indian Ocean. There are two main seas in the North Indian Ocean—the Bay of Bengal to the east of the Indian subcontinent and the Arabian Sea to the west of India. The official Regional Specialized Meteorological Centre in this basin is the India Meteorological Department (IMD), while the Joint Typhoon Warning Center (JTWC) releases unofficial advisories. An average of five tropical cyclones form in the North Indian Ocean every season with peaks in May and November. Cyclones occurring between the meridians 45°E and 100°E are included in the season by the IMD.

Sixteen depressions developed during the 1950 season, with four of them becoming cyclonic storms while three of them formed over the land. Most tropical cyclones formed in this season are weak, as there is no severe cyclonic storms formed during this season.



Season summary

Systems

Deep Depression One

A ship reported thunderstorm rains in the southeast of Sri Lanka in April 4 while a shallow low was formed in the southeast Bay of Bengal on the next day, when Car Nicobar experienced overcast conditions and northeasterly winds. The low moved west and a well-marked trough formed southeast of Sri Lanka in the morning of April 7. By April 8, the trough developed into depression as winds of 15 to 20 knots are reported by number of vessels, and a vessel reported southerly winds The depression tracked north and then tracking northeast by April 10. By April 11, the system intensified and begins to accelerate towards Burma on evening of the same day. In April 13, the system moved ashore across southern Rakhine State coasts and quickly dissipated over land.

The system dropped heavy rains on the east coast of Sri Lanka on April 8 and April 9. As the depression moved northeastwards, widespread rains occurred over Napier Bay Islands on April 11 and April 13, killing two people in Port Blair. As system made landfall near Burmese coast, heavy rains caused some damage to the property and five people.

Deep Depression Two

Cyclonic Storm Three

Depression Four

Depression Five

Land Depression Six

Depression Seven

Land Depression Eight

Depression Nine

Land Depression Ten

Depression Eleven

Cyclonic Storm Twelve

Depression Thirteen

Depression Fourteen

Cyclonic Storm Fifteen

Cyclonic Storm Sixteen

See also 
 Australian region cyclone seasons: 1949–50 1950–51
 South Pacific cyclone seasons: 1949–50 1950–51
 South-West Indian Ocean cyclone seasons: 1949–50 1950–51

References

External links
India Meteorological Department
Joint Typhoon Warning Center 

North Indian Ocean cyclone seasons
Tropical cyclones in India
1950 in India